The Malone Independent School District is a public school district located in Malone, Texas (USA).

The district has one campus, Malone Elementary, which serves students in grades pre-kindergarten through eight.

In 2009, the school district was rated "recognized" by the Texas Education Agency.

References

External links
Malone ISD

School districts in Hill County, Texas